"Jolie nana" is a song by Malian-French singer Aya Nakamura. It was released on 17 July 2020, as the lead single off her third studio album Aya. The song reached number one in France, the top 10 in Belgium (in both Flanders and Wallonia) and Switzerland, as well as the top 20 in the Netherlands.

Background and release
On 10 July 2020, Nakamura teased the song on her social media and posted a clip from behind the scenes of the music video. Upon release, publications like 20 minutes dubbed it the song of the summer.

Music video
An accompanying music video was released on 17 July 2020 and was directed by Seb Tulard. It takes place in a fictional place called "Pookie Plaza" and focuses on a group of friends following their boyfriends. Nakamura stars as the main character and assumes the role of a perfect girlfriend. The video also features French actresses Camille Lellouche and Karidja Touré. Filming of the video was partly interrupted by a police chase which took place near the set of the video.

Commercial performance
In its first three days of release, the song surpassed ten million streams on all streaming platforms. It went on to debut at number one in France, becoming her third number-one hit there. Only two weeks after release, the song was certified gold in France,

Charts

Weekly charts

Year-end charts

Certifications

References

2020 singles
2020 songs
Aya Nakamura songs
French-language songs
Number-one singles in France
Songs written by Aya Nakamura